Kolosovsky District is an administrative and municipal district (raion), one of the thirty-two in Omsk Oblast, Russia. It is located in the center of the oblast. Its administrative center is the rural locality (a selo) of Kolosovka. Population: 12,803 (2010 Census);  The population of Kolosovka accounts for 41.5% of the district's total population.

References

Notes

Sources

Districts of Omsk Oblast